Fandango is a studio album by American musician Herb Alpert released on A&M Records in April 1982 with catalog number SP-3731.

One of Alpert's most popular albums, the title tune was composed by Juan Carlos Calderón. It was briefly available on CD in the early '90s, but went out of print. In 2012, a remastered version was released on CD by Shout Factory, and is also available as a download on Alpert's official website, herbalpertpresents.com as well as the major online music vendors such as iTunes.

Background and recording
Released 20 years after the Latin-inspired "The Lonely Bull", this album marks a return to a Hispanic sound.  Alpert had wanted to do something to commemorate the 20th anniversary of his first hit, so he traveled to Mexico and made a recording intended solely for the Latin-American market.  However, his interest was kindled by the diversity and quality of the local musicians, and he decided to record an entire album there.    Additionally, research revealed that his hit "Rise" had not made an impact on his Tijuana Brass fanbase, and he wanted an album that bridged the gap between his more contemporary sound and his previous mariachi-influenced style.

Stan Freberg directed a promo for the album, satirizing TV commercials in general, but especially Ella Fitzgerald's famous spots for Memorex recording tape. In the original Memorex commercials, Fitzgerald's recorded voice shatters a drinking glass; in the Fandango spot, the sound of Alpert's trumpet smashes a giant taco hanging from the ceiling.

Reception and impact
Upon release, the album was favorably reviewed by Billboard as a "Top Album Pick". It entered the Billboard 200 on May 29, 1982 to begin a chart stay of 26 weeks, peaking at number 100.  In addition, the album peaked at #20 on Jazz Albums, and #52 on R&B Albums.  Richard S. Ginell at AllMusic gave the album a highly positive review, calling it "a masterpiece" and some tracks "spine-chilling".  He further stated the material in Fandango surpassed that of the earlier Tijuana Brass output.  Stereo Review was much less enthusiastic, stating that there was "nothing new or different" in the album.  Alpert found his Mexican recording experience so positive that he decided to form a sub-label for the Latin market, both in the U.S. and abroad, under the direction of José Quintana.

A single from this album, "Route 101", hit the top 40.  As of 2022, it is Alpert's last instrumental single to surpass that level.

Track listing

Personnel
 Trumpet, Vocals, Vocoder, Arrangement – Herb Alpert
 Arranger – Juan Carlos Calderón (track 1,6,9,11); Bill Cuomo (tracks 2,7); Michel Colombier (track 3,5); Eduardo Magallanes (track 4,8); Rafael Perez–Botija (track 5); Jose Quintana (track 10)
 Art Direction – Ayeroff & Beeson
 Artwork Design – Elizabeth Paul
 Backing Vocals – Marie Cain (track 6,11); Darlene Holden–Hoven (track 6,11); Mary Hylan (track 6,11); José Quintana (track 2);
 Bass – Abraham Laboriel (track 1,9–11); Victor Ruiz Pazos (tracks 2,4,7,8); Freddie Washington (tracks 3,5,6)
 Drums – Ralph Humphrey (track 10); Carlos Vega (tracks 1–9,11)
 Engineer – Howard Lee Wolen
 Guitar – Bernardino Santiago Gonzales (track 8); Abraham Laboriel (tracks 1,3,5,6,10,11); Tim May (tracks 3,5,6,11); Miguel Peña (tracks 2,4,7,8); Carlos Rios (track 3,6,9,11);
 Harp – Gayle Levant (track 3,5,8)
 Horns – Guillermo Espinosa (track 8); Carlos Macias (track 8)
 Keyboards/Synthesizer – Juan Carlos Calderón (track 11); Michel Colombier (tracks 1,3,5,6,8,10,11); Bill Cuomo (tracks 1,2,4,7–9,11); Eduardo Magallanes (track 8); Greg Mathieson (tracks 6,10)
 Marimba – Julius Wechter (tracks 3,11)
 Mastering – Bernie Grundman
 Percussion – Paulinho DaCosta (tracks 1–3,5–7,9,11); Laudir de Oliveira (track 10)
 Photography – Richard Avedon
 Strings – Gary Gertzweig's String Section

References

1982 albums
Herb Alpert albums
A&M Records albums
Albums produced by Herb Alpert
Instrumental albums